Achampet or Achampeta or Atchampeta may refer to:

Achampet, Nagarkurnool district, a village in Telangana, India
Achampet (SC) (Assembly constituency), a SC (Scheduled Caste) reserved constituency of the Telangana Legislative Assembly
Atchampet, Andhra Pradesh, a village in Guntur district, Andhra Pradesh, India
Atchampeta, Prakasam district, a village in Racherla mandal, Prakasam district, Andhra Pradesh, India
Atchampet mandal, Guntur district a mandal in Guntur district, Andhra Pradesh, India
Achampet, Nizamabad district, a village in Nizamsagar mandal of Nizamabad district, India